Shocklach Oviatt is a former civil parish, now in the parish of Shocklach Oviatt and District, in Cheshire West and Chester, England.  It contains three buildings that are recorded in the National Heritage List for England as designated listed buildings, all of which are listed at Grade II.  This grade is the lowest of the three gradings given to listed buildings and is applied to "buildings of national importance and special interest".  Apart from the village of Shocklach, the parish is entirely rural.  The listed buildings consist of two farmhouses and a group of farm buildings.

References

Listed buildings in Cheshire West and Chester
Lists of listed buildings in Cheshire